"What R U Waiting 4" is a song originally performed by American actress and singer Lindsay Lohan, which was included on the Confessions of a Teenage Drama Queen soundtrack in 2004; Australian singer-songwriter Tiffani Wood covered the song for her debut single, also released in 2004. The song was written by Matthew Gerrard, Bridget Benenate, and Steve Booker, whilst production was helmed by Tony Cvetkovski. "What R U Waiting 4" was Wood's first release following the disbandment of Australian girl group Bardot.

Production and recording
 
"What R U Waiting 4" was written by Matthew Gerrard, Bridget Benenate, Steve Booker; it was produced by Tony Cvetkovski. Lindsay Lohan originally performed the song, which was included on the movie soundtrack Confessions of a Teenage Drama Queen, released in February 2004. In the same year, Tiffani Wood covered the song for her debut single, utilizing a relaxed version of the instrumental in Lohan's version. Wood's version was recorded by Cvetkovski, with Cvetkovski and Wood both responsible for additional vocal arrangements on the song.

Cvetkovski and David Hemming mixed the song in Australia, while David Macquarie handled the mastering of the song.

Composition
According to the sheet music published at Musicnotes.com by Alfred Publishing, the song is written in the key of C major and is set in time signature of common time with a tempo of 92 beats per minute. Wood's vocal range spans two octaves, from G3 to E5.

Cover versions
"What R U Waiting 4" was used in the film Bratz: Rock Angelz (2005), and featured on its respective soundtrack under the name "Change the World". American singer-songwriter Natalie Grant released a cover of the song on her fourth studio album Awaken (2005).

Track listings and formats
CD single
"What R U Waiting 4"  – 3:28
"The Mirror"  – 3:49
"U & 1"  – 3:45
"What R U Waiting 4" (Instrumental) – 3:24

Charts

References

2004 singles
Lindsay Lohan songs
Songs written by Matthew Gerrard
Songs written by Bridget Benenate
Songs written by Steve Booker (producer)
2004 songs
Warner Music Group singles